Le Compas is a commune in the Creuse department in the Nouvelle-Aquitaine region in central France.

Geography

Population

Sights
 The twelfth-century church.
 A dolmen, the "Pierres Folles" near Marcillat-la-Farge.
 The château de Lavaud-Chaussade.
 The ruins of the château de Lavaud-Blanche.
 A modern chapel at Le Thiel.

See also
Communes of the Creuse department

References

Communes of Creuse